Abul Qasim Hasan Unsuri Balkhi (died 1039/1040) was a 10–11th century Persian poet. ‘Unṣurī is said to have been born in Balkh, today located in Afghanistan, and he eventually became a poet of the royal court of Mahmud of Ghazni, and was given the title Malik-us Shu'ara (King of Poets) under Sultan Maḥmūd of Ghazna. His Divan is said to have contained 30,000 distichs, of which only 2500 remain today. It includes the romance epic Vāmiq u ‘Adhrā. The following dialog between an eagle and a crow, translated by Iraj Bashiri, is an example. In it the King of Poets, Unsuri, compares his own status vis-a-vis that of a young poet who has joined the court recently.

The Eagle and The Crow: A Dialogue 
Translated by Iraj Bashiri:

A dialogue occurred, I happen to know,

Betwixt the white eagle and the crow.

Birds we are, said the crow, in the main,

Friends we are, and thus we shall remain.

Birds we are, agreed the eagle, only in name,

Our temperaments, alas, are not the same.

My leftovers are a king's feast,

Carrion you devour, to say the least.

My perch's the king's arm, his palace my bed,

You haunt the ruins, mingle with the dead.

My color is heavenly, as everyone can tell,

Your color inflicts pain, like news from hell.

Kings tend to choose me rather than you,

Good attracts good, that goes for evil too.

References

External links

http://www.angelfire.com/rnb/bashiri/Poets/Unsuri.html
 E.G. Browne. Literary History of Persia. (Four volumes, 2,256 pages, and twenty-five years in the writing). 1998. 
 Jan Rypka, History of Iranian Literature. Reidel Publishing Company. 1968 .

See also

Suri
List of Persian poets and authors

10th-century Persian-language poets
11th-century Persian-language poets
Year of birth missing
1039 deaths
Ghaznavid-period poets
People from Balkh
11th-century Iranian people
10th-century Iranian people